George William King (15 June 1822 – 22 December 1881) was an English cricketer active from 1842 to 1864 who played for Sussex. He was born in London and died in Hove. He appeared in nineteen first-class matches as a lefthanded batsman who scored 166 runs with a highest score of 25. His son George L. King also played for Sussex.

King was educated at Eton and Trinity College, Cambridge. He was president of Cambridge Union in 1843.

Notes

1822 births
1881 deaths
People educated at Eton College
Alumni of Trinity College, Cambridge
Presidents of the Cambridge Union
English cricketers
Sussex cricketers
Cambridge University cricketers